The Fabulous Baron Munchausen is a 1962 Czechoslovak romantic adventure film directed by Karel Zeman, based on the tales about Baron Munchausen. The film combines live-action with various forms of animation and is highly stylized, often evoking the engravings of Gustave Doré.

A digital restoration of the film premiered on 5 September 2016 at the Telluride Film Festival in the United States.

Plot
The film begins with footsteps leading to a pond. The camera continually moves upwards to show the flight of butterflies, birds, and a progression of historical aircraft ending with a rocket ship travelling through space and landing on the Moon.

The astronaut/cosmonaut leaves his spacecraft and sights other footsteps on the Moon leading him to an old phonograph, then a crashed rocket with a plaque reading Jules Verne's From the Earth to the Moon. Taken to a dinner table, the surprised space traveller meets the characters from Verne's book, as well as two other figures associated with fictional Moon voyages: Cyrano de Bergerac and Baron Munchausen. Inviting him to their table, the characters believe that the cosmonaut is a man actually from the Moon, and kindly treat him as a small child.

The Baron decides to take him to Earth in a fanciful airship held up by a herd of winged horses. The Baron dresses the spaceman, called "Tony" in the English dubbed version and "Tonik" in the original Czech, in 18th-century costume where they land in the 18th-century Ottoman Empire, in Constantinople. Speaking in an unintelligible voice that he calls the "language of diplomacy", the Baron presents Tonik to the Sultan. However, Tonik's lack of knowledge of diplomatic protocol and his falling in love with Princess Bianca, a damsel in distress held prisoner by the Sultan, leads to a series of romantic and fanciful adventures that transform the modern scientific space traveller into a hero rivalling the Baron.

Among the exciting and satiric adventures are sword and sea battles with the Turks, being swallowed by a giant fish, and ending the conflict between two warring kingdoms.

Cast

Miloš Kopecký as Baron Munchausen
Jana Brejchová as Princess Bianca
Rudolf Jelínek as Tony
Rudolf Hrušínský as The Sultan
Karel Höger as Cyrano de Bergerac
Eduard Kohout as General Ellemerle
Jan Werich as Ship's Captain
František Šlégr as Pirate Captain
Otto Šimánek as Michel Ardan
Naděžda Blažíčková as Court Dancer
Karel Effa as Adjutant
Josef Hlinomaz as Spanish General
Zdeněk Hodr as Nicole
Miloslav Holub as Enemy General
Miroslav Homola as Chess Player
Václav Trégl as Sailor
Bohuš Záhorský as Admiral
Richard Záhorský as Barbicain

Reception
The film was released internationally throughout the 1960s, including a 1964 American dub under The Fabulous Baron Munchausen.

Howard Thompson of The New York Times described it as "a delectable oddity with a perky, intriguing music track," and writer Harlan Ellison termed it a "charming and sweethearted 1961 Czech fantasy filled with loopy special effects."

César Santos Fontenla of Triunfo called the film "a masterpiece" and added: "the film is undoubtedly the most exciting experiment so far in animation and in combining different techniques ... The Méliès influence is present throughout the film, which reaches the same level of poetry as the works of that old master." Le Mondes film blog called Zeman's technique "perfectly fitted" (parfaitement adaptée) to the Baron Munchausen stories, and described the result as "endowed with a splendid sense of humor and very inventive" (doté d’un bel humour et très inventif). The film historian Peter Hames described Baron Prášil as "perhaps [Zeman's] finest film."

When the film was screened at the British Film Institute in the 1980s, it served as an influence for Terry Gilliam, who was then making his own version of the Munchausen stories, The Adventures of Baron Munchausen. According to Gilliam:

British magazine Home Cinema Choice voted The Fabulous Baron Munchausen the best digitally restored film of 2017, defeating such films as The Thing, The Wages of Fear and Mulholland Drive.

The restored version of the film is about six minutes shorter and omits 27 scenes compared to the original footage.

References

External links

1962 films
Baron Munchausen
Czech adventure films
Czech animated films
Czech fantasy films
Czech romantic films
1960s Czech-language films
Czechoslovak animated films
Films directed by Karel Zeman
Films set in the 18th century
Films set in Istanbul
Films set in the Ottoman Empire
Films with live action and animation
1960s romantic fantasy films
1960s stop-motion animated films
Films with screenplays by Jiří Brdečka
Films with screenplays by Karel Zeman
Films based on From the Earth to the Moon
Czech animated adventure films
Czech animated fantasy films
Czech animated romance films